Givira is a genus of moths in the family Cossidae.

Species
 Givira albosignata Ureta, 1957
 Givira amanosa  Schaus, 1911
 Givira anna (Dyar, 1898)
 Givira arbeloides (Dyar, 1899)
 Givira aregentipuncta  Schaus, 1934
 Givira argenteolaminata  Dognin, 1916
 Givira aroa (Schaus, 1894)
 Givira australis  Ureta, 1957
 Givira basiplaga (Schaus, 1905)
 Givira binubila  Dognin, 1916
 Givira brunnea  Köhler, 1924
 Givira brunneoguttata Gentili
 Givira carisca (Schaus, 1901)
 Givira carla  Dyar, 1923
 Givira chiclin  Dognin, 1905
 Givira circumpunctata (Dognin, 1916)
 Givira clathrata (Dognin, 1910)
 Givira cleopatra  Barnes & McDunnough, 1912
 Givira cornelia (Neumoegen & Dyar, 1893)
 Givira egipan  Dognin, 1923
 Givira daphne (Druce, 1901)
 Givira difflua  Dognin, 1920
 Givira durangona (Schaus, 1901)
 Givira ethela (Neumoegen & Dyar, 1893)
 Givira eureca (Schaus, 1921)
 Givira felicoma  Dyar, 1913
 Givira fidelis  Schaus, 1911
 Givira francesca (Dyar, 1909)
 Givira gabriel  Dyar, 1913
 Givira hypomelaleuca  Zukowsky, 1954
 Givira gnoma  Schaus, 1921
 Givira guata  Schaus, 1921
 Givira isarba  Schaus, 1934
 Givira isolde  Schaus, 1934
 Givira leonera  Clench, 1957
 Givira lotta  Barnes & McDunnough, 1910
 Givira lucretia Barnes & McDunnough, 1913
 Givira marga  Barnes & McDunnough, 1910
 Givira minuta  Barnes & McDunnough, 1910
 Givira moche  Dognin, 1905
 Givira modisma  Schaus, 1921
 Givira morosa  Schaus, 1911
 Givira mucida (Edwards, 1882)
 Givira nudaria (Schaus, 1901)
 Givira obidosa  Dognin, 1923
 Givira onscura  Köhler, 1924
 Givira ornata (Dognin, 1911)
 Givira pardana (Schaus, 1901)
 Givira perfida (Schaus, 1921)
 Givira philomela (Schaus, 1892)
 Givira plagiata (Schaus, 1901)
 Givira platea  Schaus, 1901
 Givira pulverosa (Hampson, 1898)
 Givira quadra (Schaus, 1901)
 Givira quadroides (Hering, 1923)
 Givira roxana (Druce, 1911)
 Givira rubida  Dognin, 1910
 Givira rufiflava (Dognin, 1917)
 Givira sabulosa (Schaus, 1901)
 Givira saladota (Dognin, 1911)
 Givira salome (Dyar, 1910)
 Givira sandelphon  Dyar, 1912
 Givira sobrana (Schaus, 1905)
 Givira stypus  Forbes, 1942
 Givira superquadra  Dognin, 1916
 Givira talboti  Dognin, 1922
 Givira tecmessa (Schaus, 1892)
 Givira theodori (Dyar, 1893)
 Givira tigrata Schaus, 1911
 Givira triplex  Schaus, 1905
 Givira tristani (Schaus, 1911)
 Givira tristis  Walker, 1856
 Givira tucumanata  Dognin, 1910
 Givira variabilis  Köhler, 1924
 Givira undulosa (Druce, 1911)
 Givira vicunensis  Ureta, 1957
 Givira viletta  Schaus, 1934
 Givira v-nigra  Köhler, 1924
 Givira watsoni  Schaus, 1901

Former species
 Givira kunzei  Dyar, 1923

References

 , 1957: Cossidae from Chile (Lepidoptera). Mitteilungen der Münchner Entomologischen Gesellschaft, 47: 122-142. Full article: .

External links
Natural History Museum Lepidoptera generic names catalog

Hypoptinae
Cossidae genera